Bihar Day (Bihar Diwas) is observed every year on March 22, marking the formation of the state of Bihar. It was on this day when the British carved out the state from Bengal in 1912. The day is a public holiday in Bihar.

Bihar Day was started and celebrated on large scale by Bihar Government in the tenure of Nitish Kumar. Apart from India, it is celebrated in countries including the United States, Germany, Britain (Scotland), Australia, Canada, Bahrain, Qatar, United Arab Emirates, Trinidad and Tobago and Mauritius.

Observance
Every year the Government of Bihar issues a notification declaring the 22 March to be a public holiday to be celebrated as Bihar Day. This holiday applies to all the offices and companies under the jurisdiction of the State and central Government as well as Schools celebrate this day by organising various programmes participated by students.

See also 
 Odisha Day
 Uttar Pradesh Day

References 

Festivals in Bihar
Indian state foundation days